Dixi may refer to:

 Dixi, a Latin expression, literally translated as "I have spoken". When used, it usually means: "I have said all that I had to say and thus the argument is settled"
 Dixi, a trade name of the former German automobile manufacturer Automobilwerk Eisenach
 Deep Impact Extended Investigation, part of the EPOXI space exploration program using the Deep Impact spacecraft
 Dixi (TV series), an interactive BBC web mystery drama
 Dixi, a brand name for co-cyprindiol (cyproterone acetate/ethinylestradiol), an oral contraceptive
 Dixi Klo, nickname for a German brand of portable toilet houses 
 , a type of Chinese opera originated in Anshun, Guizhou.
 Dixi (building), a shopping centre, office building and transport hub in Vantaa, Finland

See also
 Dixie (disambiguation)
 DIXY, a Russian grocery chain